Sergei Grigoryevich Prigoda (4 November 1957 in Moscow – 9 October 2017) was a Soviet football player and Russian coach.

He coached Mjällby AIF and IK Brage.

He died on 9 October 2017.

Honours
 Soviet Top League winner: 1976 (autumn).
 Soviet Top League bronze: 1977, 1988.
 Soviet Cup winner: 1986.
 Soviet Cup finalist: 1982, 1988, 1989.

International career
Prigoda made his debut for USSR on 28 July 1977 in a friendly against East Germany. He played in UEFA Euro 1980 qualifiers (USSR did not qualify for the final tournament).

References

External links
  Profile

1957 births
2017 deaths
Footballers from Moscow
Soviet footballers
Soviet Union international footballers
Soviet expatriate footballers
Expatriate footballers in Sweden
Expatriate football managers in Sweden
Russian football managers
Russian expatriate football managers
FC Torpedo Moscow players
Östers IF players
Soviet Top League players
Mjällby AIF managers
IK Brage managers
Allsvenskan players
Soviet expatriate sportspeople in Sweden
Russian expatriate sportspeople in Sweden
Association football defenders